The 1936 Clay Cross by-election was held on 5 November 1936.  The by-election was held due to the death of the incumbent Labour MP, Alfred Holland.  It was retained by the Labour candidate George Ridley.

References

Clay Cross by-election
Clay Cross by-election
1930s in Derbyshire
Clay Cross by-election
By-elections to the Parliament of the United Kingdom in Derbyshire constituencies